Sir Francis Joseph Soertsz KC (14 March 1886 – 10 January 1951) was an Acting Chief Justice of Ceylon who served on three occasions in 1939, 1945 and 1946.

Soertsz was born in 1886, the son of Francis William and Emily Josephine Soertsz. He was educated at Saint Joseph's College, Colombo and the Law College of Ceylon. He was knighted in the 1947 New Year Honours.

References

1886 births
1951 deaths
Sri Lankan Roman Catholics
Alumni of Saint Joseph's College, Colombo
Ceylonese Knights Bachelor
Ceylonese Queen's Counsel
20th-century Sri Lankan people
Acting Chief Justices of British Ceylon
Burgher judges
People from British Ceylon